Gerardo Compos Sandoval (born 1962) is a judge of the Superior Court of California in and for the County of San Francisco. He was formerly a member of the San Francisco Board of Supervisors. A practicing attorney, he defeated Superior Court judge Thomas J. Mellon, Jr. in a runoff election held in November 2008 after coming in first, but not obtaining a majority of votes cast in the June 2008 primary election. Sandoval, a Democrat, represented the 11th district of San Francisco, which encompasses the Excelsior neighborhood. In 2005, he ran for San Francisco County assessor, but lost to appointed incumbent Phil Ting. Sandoval was first elected to the Board of Supervisors in December 2000, and was re-elected in November 2004. In March 2000 he was elected to the San Francisco Democratic Central Committee.

Early life 

Sandoval's mother was a garment worker and homemaker.  His father was a gardener and union organizer.  Except for his oldest brother, who is developmentally disabled, all of Gerardo's siblings graduated from college.

He was in the first Head Start class in 1966 and considers himself a product of Lyndon Johnson's "Great Society". He is fully bilingual in Spanish and has traveled extensively in Latin America, Asia and Europe. Sandoval is married to the former Amy Harrington, and they have two daughters.

Sandoval attended Loyola High School in Los Angeles before graduating from the University of California, Berkeley in 1987. In 1989 he received his Master's degree in City and Regional Planning from UC Berkeley, with a specialization in real estate and housing development.  He wrote his master's thesis on using tax credits to build affordable housing. Sandoval received his Juris Doctor from Columbia University Law School. Sandoval is the first in his family to receive an advanced degree.

Career 
Sandoval worked as an assistant to San Francisco Mayor Art Agnos from 1990 to 1992, where he was responsible for budget and finance issues.  He worked as a trial attorney and Deputy Public Defender in the San Francisco Public Defender's Office for five years.  He was formerly an associate at Skadden, Arps, Slate, Meagher & Flom LLP, the largest law firm in the United States.  Sandoval also completed a three-year term on San Francisco's Public Transportation Commission, an agency with over $350 million in expenditures and 3500 employees.

As Supervisor, Sandoval passed a consular identification ordinance in San Francisco.  The ordinance requires that City employees (including police officers, airport workers, and health care workers) accept as identification the ID cards issued by foreign consulates if the cards have sufficient safeguards against fraudulent duplication and are accepted by the foreign government for entry into their national territory.  This landmark legislation has been duplicated in many major US cities including Los Angeles, New York and Chicago.  Most major US banks also accept the identification cards.  The cards are used by individuals traveling temporarily in the US such as Mexican truck drivers who are allowed under the North American Free Trade Agreement (NAFTA) to enter the US.  The cards also allow individuals to open bank accounts and otherwise access commonly available financial services.  The ordinance has been criticized by opponents as allowing undocumented workers to more easily live in the US.  Supporters of the ordinance have argued that such legislation by local governments is necessary to fill the vacuum in policy left due to inaction from federal and state governments.

Controversy and activism

Anti-Semitic remarks 
Shortly after his election, Sandoval made statements that were criticized as anti-Semitic, and Sandoval apologized at a press conference, saying "It was an unfortunate example and I apologize for it... I want to thank everyone for bringing this to my attention. As a Latino, a Mexican-American, I am sensitive to discrimination." The criticized statements were made when Sandoval spoke out against an $80 million legal settlement that the City of San Francisco was paying to its biggest corporations.  At a community meeting, Sandoval stated that the issue was not a legal one but a political one.  Sandoval articulated an argument that San Franciscans should leave no stone unturned in trying to fight back, stating people should protest at "corporate headquarters, at the homes of CEOs, and their birthdays, weddings, bar mitzvahs or wherever" as the lawsuit would take money away from underserved segments of the population.

Statements on U.S. military 
In an interview on Hannity & Colmes, San Francisco Supervisor Sandoval said that "I don't think we should have a military." He then claimed that local police and firefighters should be responsible for national defense.  Sandoval also stated in the same interview, "we should invest our money in our kids." This video can be found on YouTube.

In a February 20 op-ed for the San Francisco Chronicle, he defended his remarks by stating that his own views are in line with a municipal resident current which runs against further military involvement in city life.

Response to criticism of immigrants 
Sandoval introduced a resolution "condemning the defamatory language used by talk radio host Michael Savage" after Savage criticized undocumented immigrant protesters who were fasting in support of the controversial DREAM Act, which would give qualifying undocumented immigrants a path to US citizenship as well as enable them to receive tax payer funded in-state college tuition. While the original 9-1 vote on August 14, 2007 failed to receive the required unanimous vote, the Board’s second attempt on October 2, 2007 passed after the one dissenting supervisor had been suspended from the Board by the Mayor.

See also 
 List of Hispanic/Latino American jurists

References

External links 
 
 "Former Supervisor Gerardo Sandoval: District 11". City of San Francisco.

1962 births
Columbia Law School alumni
Living people
San Francisco Board of Supervisors members
California Democrats
Skadden, Arps, Slate, Meagher & Flom people
Hispanic and Latino American judges
Public defenders